Monroe Township is one of nine townships in Pike County, Indiana, United States. As of the 2010 census, its population was 673 and it contained 303 housing units.

Geography

Cities, towns, villages
 Spurgeon

Unincorporated towns
 Coe at 
 Enos Corner at 
 Oakland City Junction at 
 Scottsburg at 
(This list is based on USGS data and may include former settlements.)

Cemeteries
The township contains these five cemeteries: Coleman, Davis, Saint Pauls, Simpson and Union.

Major highways

Lakes
 Enos Lake
 Grey Lake

School districts
 Pike County School Corporation

Political districts
 State House District 63
 State Senate District 48

References
 
 United States Census Bureau 2009 TIGER/Line Shapefiles
 IndianaMap

External links
 Indiana Township Association
 United Township Association of Indiana
 City-Data.com page for Monroe Township

Townships in Pike County, Indiana
Jasper, Indiana micropolitan area
Townships in Indiana